Joseph Doyle (27 June 1936 – 8 August 2009) was an Irish Fine Gael politician. He served two terms as a deputy for the Dublin South-East constituency. He served variously as a member of Dublin City Council, Dáil Éireann and Seanad Éireann, becoming Lord Mayor of Dublin from 1998 to 1999.

Political career
Doyle, a former sacristan in the local Roman Catholic church in Donnybrook, was first elected to public office at the 1979 local elections, to represent the Pembroke area for Fine Gael on Dublin City Council. He served continually in City Hall from 1979 until his retirement at the 2004 local elections. Between 1998 and 1999 he served as Lord Mayor of Dublin.

He was first elected to Dáil Éireann as a Fine Gael Teachta Dála (TD) for Dublin South-East at the November 1982 general election, where his party constituency colleague was party leader (and after the election Taoiseach) Garret FitzGerald.

Rebellion on abortion
Doyle achieved early party notoriety in 1983, when he was one of eight Fine Gael TDs to defy the party and vote against the Fine Gael–Labour Party coalition's proposed wording to the anti-abortion constitutional amendment. Whereas the government's wording included a negative prohibition, namely that nothing in the constitution should be interpreted as granting a right to abortion, Doyle—along with Alice Glenn and some other colleagues—endorsed the Fianna Fáil alternative wording that granted a "right to life to the unborn, with due regard to the equal right of the mother". Because of the controversial nature of the issue of abortion, and the fact that Fine Gael was split on it, he was not sacked from the party for breaking the party whip.

Winning and losing seats
He was one of a number of TDs to lose their seats at the 1987 general election. At the Senate election that followed, he was elected by the Administrative Panel to sit in the upper house (Seanad Éireann). He regained his Dáil seat at the 1989 general election, where he and FitzGerald achieved two seats out of four with a tight vote-management strategy. However, he lost his seat again at the 1992 general election to new running mate Frances Fitzgerald. Though he contested the 1997 general election—under party pressure because it saw Doyle as the party's best chance to win a seat, even though he had originally decided not to contest any more general elections—he failed to regain a Dáil seat. He had the consolation of retaining his Senate seat in the election to the 21st Seanad.

Lord Mayor of Dublin
Doyle served as Lord Mayor of Dublin from 1998 to 1999. He was central to the decision to erect the Spire of Dublin, on the site of Nelson's Pillar.

On his retirement from Dublin City Council in 2004, his political rival, Labour Party Dublin City Councillor Dermot Lacey, paid the following tribute: "I have long respected his integrity and commitment to achieving what he believed was best for the people he represented. In many ways Joe as a politician is the epitome of the historic mandate of Fine Gael - honourable, conservative, compassionate and committed to the democratic institutions of our State."

Epilepsy
Doyle openly discussed in public life his lifelong experience of battling with epilepsy, a consequence of which was that he could not drive, normally a necessity for a local representative elected from a constituency.

Best man at Brendan Behan's wedding
He also revealed that as sacristan in the local church he had been best man at the wedding of Irish playwright and author Brendan Behan, when Behan found himself without a best man at the ceremony.

Personal life and family
Joe Doyle married Margaret Mary Maguire on 11 February 1969 in the Church of the Sacred Heart, Donnybrook, Dublin. They had two sons and one daughter. Joe's step-brother, John Doyle (1925–2009), was also active in politics and was Conservative Mayor and Bailiff of Hemel Hempstead in 1969.

Doyle was educated at CBS Westland Row.

References

External links
Joe Doyle's coat of arms, as awarded by the Chief Herald of Ireland (scroll to the end of the page)
UCD News magazine with a picture of Doyle as Lord Mayor, chatting with former President of Ireland Patrick Hillery.
Epilepsy loses a true advocate

1936 births
2009 deaths
Fine Gael TDs
Lord Mayors of Dublin
Members of the 18th Seanad
Members of the 24th Dáil
Members of the 20th Seanad
Members of the 21st Seanad
Members of the 26th Dáil
People with epilepsy
Fine Gael senators
Irish anti-abortion activists